A National Historic Landmark (NHL) is a building, district, object, site, or structure that is officially recognized by the United States government for its outstanding historical significance. Only some 2,500 (~3%) of over 90,000 places listed on the country's National Register of Historic Places are recognized as National Historic Landmarks.

A National Historic Landmark District may include contributing properties that are buildings, structures, sites or objects, and it may include non-contributing properties.  Contributing properties may or may not also be separately listed.

Creation of the program
Prior to 1935, efforts to preserve cultural heritage of national importance were made by piecemeal efforts of the United States Congress. In 1935, Congress passed the Historic Sites Act, which authorized the interior secretary authority to formally record and organize historic properties, and to designate properties as having "national historical significance", and gave the National Park Service authority to administer historically significant federally owned properties.  Over the following decades, surveys such as the Historic American Buildings Survey amassed information about culturally and architecturally significant properties in a program known as the Historic Sites Survey. Most of the designations made under this legislation became National Historic Sites, although the first designation, made December 20, 1935, was for a National Memorial, the Gateway Arch National Park (then known as the Jefferson National Expansion Memorial) in St. Louis, Missouri.  The first National Historic Site designation was made for the Salem Maritime National Historic Site on March 17, 1938.

In 1960, the National Park Service took on the administration of the survey data gathered under this legislation, and the National Historic Landmark program began to take more formal shape.  When the National Register of Historic Places was established in 1966, the National Historic Landmark program was encompassed within it, and rules and procedures for inclusion and designation were formalized.  Because listings (either on the National Register, or as an NHL) often triggered local preservation laws, legislation in 1980 amended the listing procedures to require owner agreement to the designations.

On October 9, 1960, 92 places (properties or districts) were announced as eligible to be designated NHLs by Secretary of the Interior Fred A. Seaton. Agreements of owners or responsible parties were subsequently obtained, but all 92 have since been considered listed on that 1960 date. The origins of the first National Historic Landmark was a simple cedar post, placed by the Lewis and Clark Expedition on their 1804 outbound trek to the Pacific in commemoration of the death (from natural causes) of Sgt. Charles Floyd. In time, the cedar plank was replaced by a  marble obelisk. The Sergeant Floyd Monument in Sioux City, Iowa, was officially designated on June 30, 1960, but for various reasons, the public announcement of the first several NHLs was delayed.

Criteria

NHLs are designated by the United States secretary of the interior because they are:
 Sites where events of national historical significance occurred;
 Places where prominent persons lived or worked;
 Icons of ideals that shaped the nation;
 Outstanding examples of design or construction;
 Places characterizing a way of life; or
 Archeological sites able to yield information.

Current NHLs
More than 2,500 NHLs have been designated. Most, but not all, are in the United States.There are NHLs in all 50 states and the District of Columbia. Three states (Pennsylvania, Massachusetts, and New York) account for nearly 25 percent of the nation's NHLs. Three cities within these states (Philadelphia, Boston, and New York City, respectively) all separately have more NHLs than 40 of the 50 states. New York City alone has more NHLs than all but five states: Virginia, California, Pennsylvania, Massachusetts, and New York (the latter of which has the most NHLs of all 50 states). There are 74 NHLs in the District of Columbia.

Some NHLs are in U.S. commonwealths and territories, associated states, and foreign states. There are 15 in Puerto Rico, the Virgin Islands, and other U.S. commonwealths and territories; five in U.S.-associated states such as Micronesia; and one in Morocco.

Over 100 ships or shipwrecks have been designated as NHLs.

Other
About half of the National Historic Landmarks are privately owned. The National Historic Landmarks Program relies on suggestions for new designations from the National Park Service, which also assists in maintaining the landmarks. A friends' group of owners and managers, the National Historic Landmark Stewards Association, works to preserve, protect and promote National Historic Landmarks.

If not already listed on the National Register of Historic Places, an NHL is automatically added to the Register upon designation. About three percent of Register listings are NHLs.

See also
 American Water Landmark
 List of U.S. National Historic Landmarks by state
 List of churches that are National Historic Landmarks in the United States
 Listed building, a similar designation in the UK
 National Historic Sites, Events, and Persons, similar designations in Canada
 National Natural Landmark
 United States memorials
 United States National Register of Historic Places listings

Notes

References

Further reading
Mackintosh, Barry (1985) "The Historic Sites Survey and National Historic Landmarks Program: A History", published by the National Park Service, provides a much more complete accounting of the history leading to creation of the National Historic Landmarks program, and of its first decades of operation.
This collection of correspondence and documents associated with the NHL designation of Charleston Historic District, 347 pages, published by the National Archives and Records Administration, includes, in PDF pages 36–55, the October 9, 1960, press release issued by Secretary of the Interior Fred A. Seaton announcing designation of the first 92 NHLs in five major historic theme areas.  Correspondence between Charleston's mayor and the National Park Service provides additional perspective.

External links

Official National Historic Landmarks Program website
A History of the NHL Program
List of National Historic Landmarks
National Historic Landmarks: Archaeological Properties

 
Landmarks in the United States
National Register of Historic Places
Historic preservation in the United States
Historic preservation
1960 establishments in the United States
National Park Service areas